Qandilu (also Romanized as Qandīlū) is a village in Gonbar Rural District, in the Central District of Osku County, East Azerbaijan Province, Iran. At the 2006 census, its population was 105, in 26 families.

References 

Populated places in Osku County